Agrocybe arvalis is a species of Agaricales with a brown, hygrophanous cap and brown spore print. It does not have an annulus.

Pleurocystidia can have 3–5 apical, finger-like projections.

References 

Strophariaceae
Taxa named by Elias Magnus Fries